Wealth Partaking Scheme is a cash disbursement policy to holders of a Macau Resident Identity Card by the Macau Special Administrative Region since 2008.  The main purpose of the scheme is to share the results of the region's economic development with its people and help mitigate the effects of inflation.

Target beneficiaries 
Residents who have a valid or renewable Macau Resident Identity Card are the target beneficiaries of the scheme.

Payment methods 
Beneficiaries of the Social Welfare Bureau (IAS), which include teachers who receive direct subsidies, students who are subsidized with scholarships or from the Student Welfare Fund by the Education and Youth Affairs Bureau (DESJ), other retired civil service employees, and senior citizens may have their money automatically deposited in a banking account or they can receive a crossed cheque by post.

Details of the scheme 
Francis Tam, the Secretary for Economy and Finance, announced the Wealth Partaking Scheme at the Macau Government Headquarters on May 23, 2008. He said that for the initial run of the scheme, holders of permanent and non-permanent Macau Resident Identity Cards could receive 5,000 and 3,000 patacas respectively.  More than 11,000 people who qualified for Macau Resident Identity Card applied for one after the scheme was announced, hoping to receive money. This is 10 times more than the normal number of applications.

In his policy address on November 11, 2008, Chief Executive of Macau Edmund Ho announced that the region would have another wealth sharing scheme in the next fiscal year (2009) to help offset the negative economic influence of the Financial crisis of 2007–08.  This time, permanent and non-permanent residents would receive 6,000 and 3,600 patacas as announced by Edmund Ho during the question and answer session in the Legislative Assembly of Macau on April 16, 2009.  Every year since, the scheme has been a regular part of the Policy Address.

In his policy address on November 16, 2010, Chief Executive of Macau Fernando Chui announced a substantial decrease for the scheme to 4,000 and 2,400 patacas for permanent and non-permanent residents respectively. The next year on April 21, 2011, Chui announced that "Cash Subsidy" would be 3,000 and 1,800 patacas to permanent and non-permanent residents respectively for that fiscal year.  Despite this reduction, the total subsidy distribution in fiscal year 2011 was more than the previous fiscal year and it was the fiscal year to have cash subsidy policy only.

Subsidy amount by year

Supporting department 
The Government of Macau set up the "Support Centre for Wealth Disbursement" in Largo Tap Seac on July 1, 2008 to disburse the payments and provide related services for the scheme.  As the cheque from the scheme for each fiscal year is valid for 3 years, the Service Center of the Civic and Municipal Affairs Bureau (IACM) has acted on behalf of the Wealth Partaking Payment Assistance Center which located in 2/F, Edifício China Plaza, Avenida da Praia Grande since November 3, 2008.

See also
 Basic income, unconditional government cash payments to the public
 Scheme $6,000, a similar scheme by the Hong Kong Government
 Social dividend, unconditional cash payment to the public derived from assets under public ownership

References

External links 
 Official website for the Wealth Partaking Scheme

2008 in Macau
Politics of Macau
Economy of Macau
Taxation and redistribution